Dead Low Tide was a short-lived rock band from Seattle, Washington. It featured singer Spencer Moody, guitarist Nate Manny, bassist Mike Kunka, and drummer Coady Willis.

History
After the breakup of the Murder City Devils in 2001, ex-members Moody, Manny, and Willis began to work on a new project, along with ex-godheadSilo bassist Kunka. In 2002 they put out a self-released debut EP, and embarked on a U.S. tour with the Melvins. That same year they began recording their eponymously titled, full-length album, which was not released until after the band's breakup in 2003.

Discography

Albums
Dead Low Tide (Tiger Style Records CD/LP, 2003)
 Barrel Vault
 White Flag
 Navy Buttons
 Blues Come Easy
 Ill Eagle
 Lazer Lazer Lazer Love
 Purple Crimson and Lavender
 Don't Mind If I Do
 Sideways Machine
 Shake and Slide

Singles and EPs
"Lazer Lazer Lazer Love" (Ill Eagle 7", 2002)
Dead Low Tide EP (Ill Eagle CD/EP, 2002)

Further reading
 Crawdaddy! article on Murder City Devils and Dead Low Tide, "Ride the Dead Low Tide," March 26, 2008

Garage rock groups from Washington (state)
Musical groups established in 2001
Musical groups disestablished in 2003
2001 establishments in the United States
Musical groups from Seattle